The name partridge berry is commonly applied to a number of plant species including:
Mitchella repens
Gaultheria procumbens
Vaccinium vitis-idaea (in Newfoundland and Labrador), better known as lingonberry